The Citroën BX is a large family car which was produced by the French manufacturer Citroën from 1982 to 1994. In total, 2,315,739 BXs were built during its 12-year history. The hatchback was discontinued in 1993 with the arrival of the Xantia, but the estate continued for another year. The BX was designed to be lightweight, using particularly few body parts, including many made from plastics.

History 

The Citroën BX was announced in June 1982, but its commercial life really only began in the Autumn of that year, with a Paris presentation on 2 October 1982 under the Eiffel Tower. The BX was designed to replace the successful small family car Citroën GS/GSA that was launched in 1970, with a larger vehicle (although the GSA continued until 1986). The French advertising campaign used the slogan "J'aime, j'aime, j'aime" showing the car accompanied by music written specially by Julien Clerc. The British advertising campaign used the slogan "Loves Driving, Hates Garages", reflecting the effort of Citroën to promote the reduced maintenance costs of the BX, over the higher than average maintenance costs of the technologically advanced GS/GSA; while still performing in the Citroën style on the road.

The angular hatchback was designed by Marcello Gandini of Bertone, based on his unused design for the British 1977 Reliant FW11 concept and his 1979 Volvo Tundra concept car. It was the second car to benefit from the merger of Peugeot and Citroën in 1976, the first being the Citroën Visa launched in 1978. The BX shared its platform with the more conventional 405 that appeared in 1987, except the rear suspension which is from a Peugeot 305 Break. Among the features that set the car apart from the competition was the traditional Citroën hydropneumatic self-levelling suspension, extensive use of plastic body panels (bonnet, tailgate, bumpers), and front and rear disc brakes.

The BX was launched onto the right-hand drive UK market in August 1983, initially only with 1.4 and 1.6 petrol engines, although by 1986 it had been joined by more engine options as well as a five-door estate model. The BX enjoyed a four-year run as the UK's best selling diesel engine car from 1987, and was one of the most popular foreign-built cars there during the second half of the 1980s. However, just 485 examples were remaining on Britain's roads by February 2016. 

The BX dispensed with the air cooled, flat four engine which powered the GS, and replaced it with the new PSA group XY, TU and XU series of petrol engines in 1360 cc, 1580 cc and, from 1984, 1905 cc displacements.  A 1124 cc engine, very unusual in a car of this size, was also available in countries where car tax was a direct function of engine capacity, such as Ireland, Italy, Portugal and Greece. The 1.1 and 1.4 models used the PSA X engine (known widely as the "Douvrin" or "Suitcase Engine"), the product of an earlier Peugeot/Renault joint venture, and already fitted in the Peugeot 104 and Renault 14. The 1.6 version was the first car to use the all-new short-stroke XU-series engine. It was produced in a new engine plant at Trémery built specifically for this purpose, and was later introduced in a larger 1.9-litre version and saw long service in a variety of Peugeots and Citroëns. The XUD diesel engine version was launched in November 1983. The diesel and turbo diesel models were to become the most successful variants, they were especially popular as estates and became the best selling diesel car in Britain in the late 1980s. 

The petrol engines were badged as 11, 14, 16, 19 — signifying engine size (with the exception of the 17 diesel model, which was actually a 1769 cc, 1.8-liter unit). In some countries, a weaker,  DIN version of the 1.6 L engine was badged as the BX15 instead of BX16. The 11TE model was seen by foreign motoring press as slow and uncomfortable. The 1.1 L engine with engine code H1A was installed in the BX for the Italian, Greek, and Portuguese markets specifically. It was fitted from 1988 to 1993 and produces  DIN at 5800 rpm.

A year after the launch of the hatchback model, an estate version ("Break", "Evasion") was made available. The Breaks were all built by Heuliez at their recently updated plant in Cerizay. In 1984 power steering became optional, welcome particularly in the diesel models. In the late 1980s, a four-wheel drive system and turbodiesel engines were introduced.

In 1986 the MK2 BX was launched. The interior and dashboard was redesigned to be more conventional-looking than the original, which used Citroën's idiosyncratic "satellite" switchgear, and "bathroom scale" speedometer. These were replaced with more conventional stalks for light and wipers and analogue instruments. The earlier GT (and Sport) models already had a "normal" speedometer and tachometer. The exterior was also slightly updated, with new more rounded bumpers, flared wheelarches to accept wider tyres, new and improved mirrors and the front indicators replaced with larger clear ones which fitted flush with the headlights. The elderly Douvrin engine was replaced by the newer TU-series engine on the 1.4 litre models, although it continued to be installed in the tiny BX11 until 1992.

1988 saw the launch of the BX Turbo Diesel, which was praised by the motoring press. The BX diesel was already a strong seller, but the Turbo model brought new levels of refinement and performance to the diesel market, which brought an end to the common notion that diesel cars were slow and noisy. Diesel Car magazine said of the BX "We can think of no other car currently on sale in the UK that comes anywhere near approaching the BX Turbo's combination of performance, accommodation and economy".

In 1989, the BX range had further minor revisions and specification improvements made to it, including smoked rear lamp units, new wheeltrims and interior fabrics.

Winning many Towcar of the Year awards, the BX was renowned as a tow car (as was its larger sister, the CX), especially the diesel models, due to their power and economy combined with the self levelling suspension.

The biggest problem of the BX was its variable build quality, compared to its competition. In 1983, one quarter of the production needed "touchups" before they could be shipped. Later models were better built, but the reputation had been tarnished. It had been partially replaced by the smaller ZX in early 1991, but its key replacement was the slightly larger Xantia that went on sale at the beginning of 1993, when the BX hatchback was discontinued, although the estate models lasted into the following year, when the estate version of the Xantia was launched.

Performance models

Sport

As well as the normal BX, Citroën produced the BX Sport from 1985 to 1987. During this period, Citroën produced 7,500 BX Sports; 2,500 in the first series, then an extra 5,000 due to its sales success. The engine modifications, including a reshaped combustion chamber and larger valves, were developed by famous French tuner Danielson. It also stood out with its unique body kit, alloy wheels later also used on the GTi, a unique dashboard and Pullman interior. The seat fabric was the same as that used on the CX Turbo at the time. The body kit included a rear wing, side skirts, and fender extensions that added 10 cm to each side of the car in order to accommodate the larger wheels. The car was only available in LHD and was not sold in the United Kingdom. Period road tests complimented the ride quality (as usual with Citroëns) but complained that the driving characteristics were not all that sporty as a result, even though the suspension had also been modified.

GT

The BX GT was launched in 1985 and featured a 1.9 L Peugeot-sourced engine, in general a Sport engine with only one twin choke carburettor. That same year, Citroën produced a "Digit" model, which was based on the BX GT. It featured a digital instrument cluster and an onboard computer. Citroën only produced 4,000 BX Digits in 1985.

4TC

Citroën entered Group B rallying with the BX in 1986. The specially designed rally BX was called the BX 4TC and bore little resemblance to the standard BX. It had a very long nose because the engine (a turbocharger fitted version of Chrysler Europe's Simca Type 180 engine) was mounted longitudinally, unlike in the regular BX. The engine was downsleeved to 2,141.5 cc (from 2,155 cc) to stay under the three-litre limit after FIA's multiplication factor of 1.4 was applied. The rally version of the BX also featured the unique hydropneumatic suspension, and the five-speed manual gearbox from the Citroën SM. The rear axle was from the rear-wheel drive Peugeot 505, with a carbon fibre prop shaft.

The 4TC was not successful in World Rally Championship competition, its best result being a sixth place in the 1986 Swedish Rally. The 4TC only participated in three rallies before the Group B class was banned in late 1986, following the death of Henri Toivonen in his Lancia Delta S4 at the Tour de Corse Rally. Aside from being overweight and with bad weight distribution, the BX 4TC also suffered from restricted suspension travel compared to the competition and did not feature a central differential, meaning that the front and rear axle were usually struggling against each other - limiting the cars effectiveness on tarmac in particular.

Already discouraged by the car's poor performance in motorsport and the demise of Group B, Citroën was only able to sell 62 roadgoing 4TCs; build quality and reliability problems led Citroën to buy back many of these 4TCs for salvage and destruction. With only a fraction of the original 200 examples remaining, the 4TC is now highly sought after. While a few privateers continued to campaign the BX 4TC Evolution in the French rallycross championships, Citroën pressured them to stop and by 1989 the competition history of the BX 4TC came to a final end.

GTi

An uprated version of the BX GT, the BX19 GTi was fitted with a 1.9 L eight-valve fuel injected engine producing  (this engine also fitted to the Peugeot 405 SRi, and being very similar to the engine also fitted to the 205 GTi, however the BX19 GTi and Peugeot 405 SRi used a different inlet manifold and cylinder head to the Peugeot 205 GTi,), a spoiler and firmer suspension spheres/anti-roll bar than the standard model; it could reach 198 km/h. There was also a special export model, the BX16 GTi, using the  XU5JA engine from the Peugeot 205 GTi 1.6.

16V

In May 1987, a 16-valve version of the GTi was launched. This was the first mass-produced French car to be fitted with a 16-valve engine. A DOHC twin-exhaust port cylinder head, based on that of the Peugeot 205 Turbo 16 Group B rally car was bolted to an uprated version of the 1905 cc XU9 8v alloy engine block as fitted to the BX GTi and Peugeot 205 GTi. More specifically, it produced a specific output of 84 bhp/litre, which for a fixed cam-timing, naturally aspirated engine was fairly impressive at the time. Anti-lock brakes were fitted as standard. Its side skirts made it easily recognizable from all other BX models. In 1990, the facelift of the 16V gave the car a new lease of life. The updated car came with new fibreglass bumpers, anthracite painted wheels, smoked taillight lenses, and a redesigned rear spoiler. These cosmetic changes made the car look even more distinctive from other BXs. There were also a few subtle changes made to the car's performance, the most noticeable being harder suspension and a thicker anti-roll bar, which improved handling.

The BX 16V was found to be faster around a race-track than the "in house" competitor Peugeot 405 Mi16 in a test in the Swedish motoring magazine Teknikens Värld. Also in Sweden, young driver Magnus Gustafsson competed successfully in rally with a group A tuned BX 16V. The engine produced  and Gustafsson was second in the Swedish International Rally 1993 in the A7 category.

Engines

BX Van

A version of the BX with an extended fiberglass roof and no rear seat called the BX Van was produced in Finland. At the time vans had to pay a smaller registration tax than passenger cars so people wanted to be able to register the BX as a van. The regular BX estate couldn't be registered as a van in Finland because Finnish law required vans to have a cargo space at least 130 centimeters high and 2.5m3 in cargo volume, lengthwise measured awkwardly from inner boot lid to the bottom of steering wheel (nobody knows the whole phenomena on how the volume was counted back in times). The higher roof was achieved by cutting off the original steel roof and replacing it with a large box made of fiberglass. The BX Van was quite popular and over 2000 of them were sold.

A different van version was marketed in Ireland. This was directly based upon the shape of the estate but with rear doors and windows removed.

See also
Anadol FW 11 (1977)

References

External links 

Citroën BX - Citroën Origins
 Citroën BX 16-valve Club
 BX links Citroën World
 web based UK BX owners club
 1984 Citroën BX16 TRS - road test
 Citroën Car Club

1990s cars
All-wheel-drive vehicles
BX
Front-wheel-drive vehicles
Group B cars
Hatchbacks
Mid-size cars
Rally cars
Station wagons
Cars introduced in 1982
Cars discontinued in 1994